Aaron Stuart Dillaway (born 23 March 1971) is an Australian Liberal National politician who was the member of the Legislative Assembly of Queensland for Bulimba, having defeated Di Farmer, the incumbent, at the 2012 state election. After the initial count showed Dillaway had won by 85 votes, a recount confirmed his victory by 74 votes. He was only the third conservative to hold the seat since 1915, and the first since 1932. Farmer defeated him in a rematch in 2015.

References

1971 births
Living people
Liberal National Party of Queensland politicians
Members of the Queensland Legislative Assembly
21st-century Australian politicians